Paolo Rossi (1956–2020) was an Italian association football player and 1982 FIFA World Cup winner.

Paolo Rossi may also refer to:
Paolo Alberto Rossi (1887–1969), Italian diplomat
Paolo Rossi (politician) (1900–1985), Italian lawyer and politician
Paolo Rossi (actor) (born 1953), Italian actor and comedian
Paolo Rossi (footballer, born 1982), Italian footballer

See also
Rossi (surname)